"Speak Like a Child" is the debut single by English pop band the Style Council, released on 11 March 1983 and was included on the mini-LP, Introducing The Style Council (1983). Backed with "Party Chambers", it became a hit, peaking at number 4 on the UK Singles Chart. Band members Paul Weller and Mick Talbot were already well-known from their previous bands, the Jam and the Merton Parkas, respectively. It has remained one of their most enduring hits.

The single also features Tracie Young, who had just signed to Weller's Respond Records label, on backing vocals.

Compilation appearances
As well as the song's single release, it has featured on various Style Council compilation albums. The song was included on The Singular Adventures of The Style Council (1989), The Complete Adventures of The Style Council (1998), and Greatest Hits (2000).

Track listing
 7" single (TSC1, TSC 1, 810 873-7)
"Speak Like a Child" – 3:15
"Party Chambers" – 3:20

Personnel
Credits are adapted from the album's liner notes.

Musicians
 Paul Weller – lead vocals, guitars
 Mick Talbot – keyboards
 Zeke Manyika – drums
 Tracie Young – backing vocals

Charts

References

External links
 

1983 songs
1983 debut singles
The Style Council songs
Songs written by Paul Weller
Polydor Records singles